The A. B. Simpson Alliance School, Inc. (ABSAS) is a school owned by the Christian and Missionary Alliance Churches of the Philippines (CAMACOP) in Zamboanga City, Philippines. It was named after the founder of the Christian and Missionary Alliance, Albert Benjamin Simpson. The school offers a complete elementary and secondary education for boys and girls, except for preschool level.

History
The A. B. Simpson Alliance School started as a dream of the CAMACOP to establish a basic education program as a part of its ministry emphasis. The A. B. Simpson Alliance School opened on 13 June 2000 under the management of principal Lolita V. De Sosa. During the school year 2003–2004, a computer education was introduced to the school's curriculum.

Student life
Its official student publication is The Frontliners. The Supreme Student Government (SSG) has been the student government since 2005. The SSG consists of the president, vice-president, secretary, treasurer, auditor, press information officer and representatives from grade 4 to third year.

Every year, the school celebrates its one-week Foundation Day celebrating its founding since 2001. Sports festivities and other events are involved in this event.

See also
Christian and Missionary Alliance Churches of the Philippines
Albert Benjamin Simpson

References
https://web.archive.org/web/20100803052235/http://camacop.org.ph/php/ministries/dgte/report/dgtereport-03292009.php

Schools in Zamboanga City
Christian and Missionary Alliance